Benaam is a 1999 Indian Hindi-language action thriller film directed by T L V Prasad, starring Mithun Chakraborty, Aditya Pancholi, Payal Malhotra, Ashish Vidyarthi, Kiran Kumar and Johny Lever.

Plot
The movie starts with an action scene of the murder. A masked man kills four people out for revenge. The police could not find out who is behind the mask and why he is killing people.

Cast
Mithun Chakraborty as Prakash/Kipi
Aditya Pancholi as Shera
Payal Malhotra as Sheetal
Ashish Vidyarthi as Damak
Kiran Kumar as Jagral
Johny Lever as Munna Mobile
Harish Patel as Bankhelal
 Kasam Ali as Shankar
 Pinky Chinoy as Mona
 Rajendra Gupta
 Dev Malhotra
 Ramesh Goyal
 Smriti Patkar
 Rani Sinha
 Shyam Solanki

Music
"Ankh Mila Le" - preeti Uttam, Jolly Mukherjee
"Aaapka Naam kya" - Altaf Raja
"Baajre Ke Khet Mein" - Jaspinder Narula
"Chanda Jaisi bindiya" - Abhijeet, Sapna Mukherjee
"Jab Woh Nikalta Hai" - Sapna Mukherjee, Amit Kumar
"O Hawa Sard Hai" - Poornima

References

External links
 

1999 films
1990s Hindi-language films
Mithun's Dream Factory films
Films shot in Ooty
Films scored by Bappi Lahiri
Indian action thriller films